Gosney is a surname. Notable people with the surname include:

 Andy Gosney (born 1963), English footballer
 Barrie Gosney (1926–2008), English actor
 E. S. Gosney (1855–1942), American philanthropist and eugenicist
 Harold Gosney (born 1937), British artist and sculptor
 Jeanette Gosney (born 1958), British Anglican priest
 Kerrie Gosney (born 1976), British television presenter
 Joe Gosney (Born 1990), British musician